Chapelle-Viviers is a commune in the Vienne department in the Nouvelle-Aquitaine region in western France.

History
The settlement is mentioned in the 10th century but in 1452 it is mentioned by a similar name to its current one. The present church dates from 1870. It was paid for by leading local families after the previous small church was going to ruin.

See also
Communes of the Vienne department

References

Communes of Vienne